Phil Corley (born 17 April 1951) is a former British professional road racing cyclist.

Cycling career 
Corley represented Great Britain at the UCI Road World Championships three times in 1975, 1976 and 1978.

In 1977, he participated in the only monument of his career; Paris–Roubaix, finishing 43rd overall.

In 1978, Corley won the British National Road Race Championships, this being the biggest win of his career.

Post-cycling career

In 1979, Corley founded his bike shop business, Corley Cycles, in Great Linford, Milton Keynes. 

In 1981, the shop moved to a larger premises in Neath Hill. 

Finally in 1982, the shop relocated to the industrial area of Stacey Bushes where it has been ever since.

Career achievements

Major results
1975
 6th Road race, National Road Championships
1976
 3rd Road race, National Road Championships
1977
 7th Road race, National Road Championships
1978
 1st  Road race, National Road Championships
1984
 10th Road race, National Road Championships

References

External links  

1951 births
Living people
English male cyclists
British cycling road race champions